is a manga artist known for the manga Rosario + Vampire.

Biography 
Ikeda was born in Miyazaki in 1976. His first work, Kiruto, debuted in 2002 in Monthly Shōnen Jump. It is described as a "four-volume magical warrior fantasy series". Rosario + Vampire debuted in Monthly Shōnen Jump in March 2004 and continued in Jump Square (Jump SQ) as Rosario+Vampire: Season II until its conclusion in 2014. Rosario has been adapted into a drama CD and anime series, as well as some video games. He has mentioned having the same editor since he was 16 until the beginning of volume 7 of Rosario. In the March 2014 issue, Ikeda concluded the Rosario series.

Influences 
Ikeda has mentioned that he has been a huge fan of vampires and monsters since he was a child.  He also enjoys reading detective novels from "Holmes, Lupin, Kindaichi, Nijyumenso and the like". In an interview at Lucca Comics 2012, Ikeda says he is a big fan of Tim Burton and was inspired by his works, including The Nightmare Before Christmas, and particularly Edward Scissorhands because the monster has a sensitive soul. He had researched various monsters from the encyclopedias and the Internet. His first character design for Rosario was Moka Akashiya, a beautiful girl vampire with a crucifix around her neck; he then created the school of monsters and Tsukune afterward. He credits the beautiful girls for the series' popularity but added the fighting elements. After the first series ended with the retirement of the Monthly Shōnen Jump magazine, and with the serialization in a second magazine, Jump Square, he retitled the second series to give it a sense of renewal.

Notable works 
 Kiruto (2002)
 Rosario + Vampire (2004–07)
 Rosario + Vampire: Season II  (2008–14)
 Ghost Reaper Girl (2020-)

References

External links 

  at Simon & Schuster
 
 

1976 births
People from Miyazaki Prefecture
Manga artists from Miyazaki Prefecture
Living people